Samuel James Champion (born August 13, 1961) is an American weather anchor who is best known for his combined 25-year career on the ABC flagship station WABC-TV and Good Morning America. He formerly co-anchored AMHQ: America's Morning Headquarters and 23.5 Degrees With Sam Champion on The Weather Channel.

After December 4, 2013, his final day with ABC, he became the managing editor of The Weather Channel, beginning on January 1, 2014. Champion also appeared on the Today show on NBC.  After leaving NBC and the Weather Channel in 2016, he returned to ABC on a fill-in basis and returned to become the weekday morning and noon weather anchor at WABC-TV in June 2019.

Early life and education
Champion was born in Paducah, Kentucky, to Sylvia and James H. Champion on August 13, 1961. He has one sibling, sister Teresa. His father, who died October 25, 2010, was a lieutenant colonel in the U.S. Marine Corps who served in Vietnam. He graduated from Fairfax High School in Fairfax, Virginia in 1979.  He has a B.A. in broadcast news from Eastern Kentucky University, and interned at WKYT-TV in Lexington, Kentucky.

Career
Champion worked at WPSD-TV in Paducah, Kentucky, and WJKS (later WCWJ) in Jacksonville, Florida. He became a weather presenter for WABC-TV's Eyewitness News in New York City in 1988. He went on Good Morning America at a salary in 2004 of $1.5 million per year. On April 7, 2008 he debuted as host of Sea Rescue, an educational and informational program in Litton's Weekend Adventure that focuses on the rescue, rehabilitation, and in many instances release of animals back into wildlife.

In August 2006, Good Morning America announced Champion would join that show and ABC News, effective September 5, 2006. Champion announced his departure from ABC on December 2, 2013, to become an on-air presence at and managing editor of The Weather Channel. His last day on Good Morning America was December 4, 2013. He was immediately replaced by Ginger Zee.

He had occasionally appeared on Live with Kelly and Ryan, the daily talk show produced by WABC-TV, and CNN's Larry King Live. He often begins his 30-second weathercasts by saying, "Let's get to the boards." His catchphrase when breaking for weather reports from local ABC stations is, "That's the weather around the nation. Here's what you can expect this morning."

Immediately following his departure from GMA, it was announced that Champion would join The Weather Channel to host his own morning show, titled America's Morning Headquarters which debuted on March 17, 2014. In September 2015, it was revealed that Champion would leave AMHQ to serve as a contributor to its primetime programs. In December 2016, Champion and The Weather Channel decided not to renew their contract. As a result, Champion left the company on December 27, 2016.
 
He returned to ABC as a fill-in weather forecaster on Good Morning America during the maternity leave of Chief Meteorologist Ginger Zee, his replacement. On May 22, 2019, it was announced that Champion would be returning to WABC-TV's morning and noon newscasts and contributing to ABC News, beginning June 3, 2019.

On September 8, 2022, Champion was announced as a contestant on season 31 of Dancing with the Stars. He is partnered with Cheryl Burke.

Personal life
Champion is active in many charitable organizations in the New York City area. He was the Grand Marshal of the Multiple Sclerosis Society Fall Bike Tour, the chairman of the 25th annual March of Dimes NYC WalkAmerica, and master of ceremonies of "Stopping AIDS Together," a part of Sunday by the Bay. He hosted the New York City Anti-Violence Project's 2002 "Courage Awards," along with movie critic Frank DeCaro.

Champion had a basal cell carcinoma removed from his skin in May 2010 while on air, after previous bouts with the disease.  He said he wanted to raise awareness about skin cancer during Cancer Awareness Month.

Champion and his partner of several years, Rubem Robierb, were married on December 21, 2012.

See also
 Broadcast network
 LGBT culture in New York City
 List of LGBT people from New York City
 Morning television
 New Yorkers in journalism

References

1961 births
Living people
ABC News personalities
Eastern Kentucky University alumni
American gay men
American LGBT broadcasters
LGBT people from Kentucky
LGBT people from New York (state)
Television anchors from New York City
People from Paducah, Kentucky
Weather presenters
The Weather Channel people
Managing editors